Buttsworth may refer to:

 Coral Buttsworth (1900–1985), Australian tennis player
 Fred Buttsworth (1927–2021), Australian rules footballer 
 Fred Buttsworth (cricketer, born 1880) (1880–1974), Australian cricketer
 Wally Buttsworth (1917–2002), Australian rules footballer